Lawrence Waya (born 25 May 1963 in Mphonde, Nyasaland) is a former Malawi international football player and manager.

Club career
Born in the village of Mphonde in Phalombe District, Waya joined local club Bata Bullets in 1980. He spent most of his career with Bullets, but had a brief spell in the United Arab Emirates with Al Jazira Club, and finished his career with Silver Strikers F.C.

International career
Waya made over 100 appearances for the Malawi national football team, including seven FIFA World Cup qualifying matches. Waya won a bronze medal with Malawi at the 1987 All-Africa Games in Nairobi.

Career as manager
After retiring from playing, Waya took coaching courses in the United Kingdom and received a UEFA 'B' Licence. He would then return to Malawi to manage Big Bullets.

See also
 List of men's footballers with 100 or more international caps

References

External links

1963 births
Living people
People from Phalombe District
Malawian footballers
Malawian expatriate footballers
Malawi international footballers
Nyasa Big Bullets FC players
Al Jazira Club players
UAE Pro League players
Expatriate footballers in the United Arab Emirates
African Games bronze medalists for Malawi
African Games medalists in football

Association football forwards
Competitors at the 1987 All-Africa Games
FIFA Century Club